Innvik is a former municipality in the old Sogn og Fjordane county in Norway. The  municipality existed from 1838 until 1965. Innvik is located in the present-day Stryn Municipality in Vestland county, encompassing about the western third of the present municipality. Innvik included both sides of the Nordfjorden, from Randabygda in the west to just west of the village of Stryn.  It stretched from the border with Hornindal Municipality in the north, through the Oldedalen valley all the way to the Jostedalsbreen glacier in the south.

Name
The name comes from the old Innvik farm, since the first Innvik Church is located there.  The old name is identical with the word vík which means "inlet".  Over time, the prefix inn- (meaning "inner") was added to distinguish the area from nearby Utvik (meaning "outer" Vik). The name Indvigen or the more modern spelling Innvik has been in use since the 15th century.

History
The municipality was established as Indvigen formannskapsdistrikt on 1 January 1838. In 1843, the eastern part of the municipality was separated from Innvik to form the new Stryn Municipality, leaving Innvik with 2,675 inhabitants. On 1 October 1922, the Raksgrenda area (between the villages of Loen and Stryn), with 120 inhabitants, was administratively transferred from Innvik to Stryn. During the 1960s, there were many municipal mergers across Norway due to the work of the Schei Committee. On 1 January 1965, Innvik Municipality and neighboring Stryn Municipality were merged back together, creating a much larger municipality named Stryn. Prior to the merger, Innvik municipality had 3,003 inhabitants.

Government

Municipal council
The municipal council  of Innvik was made up of 25 representatives that were elected to four year terms.  The party breakdown of the final municipal council was as follows:

See also
List of former municipalities of Norway

References

External links

Weather information for Innvik 

Stryn
Former municipalities of Norway
1838 establishments in Norway
1965 disestablishments in Norway